also called  (You gates of Zion), BWV 193, is a sacred cantata by Johann Sebastian Bach. The music survives in an incomplete state.

History and words 

While living in Leipzig Bach composed several cantatas for the Ratswechsel, the inauguration of the newly elected town council. This event took place in a festive service, which was not part of the liturgical year, on the Monday following the feast of St. Bartholomew on 24 August. Another cantata was performed in 1725, but only the text has survived. Bach first performed , BWV 193 on 25 August 1727 at St. Nicholas Church.

The words are by an unknown poet, who is assumed by Christoph Wolff to have been Bach's regular collaborator Picander, the librettist of the related secular cantata. The text identifies Leipzig with the holy city of Jerusalem, praising God as the protector of the "". Ideas from psalms are included, using Psalm 87:2, "The Lord loveth the gates of Zion more than all the dwellings of Jacob." in movement 1, and Psalm 121:4, "Behold, he that keepeth Israel shall neither slumber nor sleep." in movement 2.

The work shared material with a secular cantata which premiered the same month. Movements 1, 3 and 5 of Ihr Tore zu Zion are probably a parody of the secular work. However, the music of this piece is also lost. According to Alfred Dürr, both works may include earlier music, perhaps composed in Köthen. The first chorus is repeated at the end as is stated at the end of most extant parts ("Chorus ab initio repetatur").

The surviving music was first published in 1894. It cannot be given a satisfactory performance without a certain amount of reconstruction of lost material, as the parts for tenor, bass, basso continuo and other instruments (probably trumpets and timpani, maybe also flutes) for all of the music are missing. A reconstruction was made for Helmuth Rilling in 1983 by Reinhold Kubik. Ton Koopman made a version for his 1999 recording, adding a recitative for bass at the end.  Other reconstructions of the work were made by Michael Radulesco and Alan Dergal Rautenberg. To achieve the scoring Bach usually used for festive occasions, all of these reconstructions restore the missing tenor and bass parts in the opening chorus as well as the basso continuo for the whole work and add trumpets and timpani.

Scoring and structure 

The music in seven movements survives in an incomplete state. Only two vocal parts are extant (soprano and alto). The parts for tenor and bass are missing. The instrumental parts which survive are for two oboes, two violins and viola. The continuo line is missing completely, as are parts for any additional instruments deployed by Bach. For a festive occasion he typically scored trumpets and timpani.

 Chorus: 
 Recitative (soprano): 
 Aria (soprano): 
 Recitative (alto): 
 Aria (alto): 
 Recitative [lost]
  (repeated from the beginning)

Music 

The chorus is opened by a long ritornello, which is repeated completely in the middle of the movement, but not in the end. The existing vocal parts suggest that the choral writing was mostly in homophony.

The first aria is a minuet in da capo form. Musicologist Julian Mincham likens the interplay of oboe and strings to music of Handel. They begin in unison, then the oboe plays only the top notes of the strings, finally it "emerges with its own melody". In the second aria for alto, oboe and continuo, the ornamentation of the oboe stands for God's blessings. Mincham concludes from the unison of voice and oboe from measure 13 that mankind is depicted in tune with it.

Recordings 

 Die Bach Kantate Vol. 67, Helmuth Rilling, Gächinger Kantorei, Bach-Collegium Stuttgart, Arleen Augér, Julia Hamari, Hänssler 1983
 J.S. Bach: Complete Cantatas Vol. 19, Ton Koopman, Amsterdam Baroque Orchestra & Choir, Caroline Stam, Michael Chance, Paul Agnew, Antoine Marchand 1999

Notes

References

Sources 

 
 
 Cantata BWV 193 Ihr Tore zu Zion history, scoring, sources for text and music, translations to various languages, discography, discussion, Bach Cantatas Website
 Ihr Tore zu Zion history, scoring, Bach website 
 BWV 193 Ihr Tore /Pforten/ zu Zion English translation, University of Vermont
 BWV 193 Ihr Tore zu Zion text, scoring, University of Alberta 

Council cantatas by Johann Sebastian Bach
Psalm-related compositions by Johann Sebastian Bach
1727 compositions